Karnataka liquor deaths are deaths in Karnataka state in India in 1981 by consuming illegal liquor. In July 1981 about 308 people died in Bangalore by illicit liquor. Adulteration of cheap liquor by methyl alcohol resulted in deaths.

Availability of cheap spurious alcohol (known as hooch) is a problem around the Tannery Road area of the Bangalore Cantonment, with many dwellers getting addicted. Notorious bootlegger Marimuthu (who later became a councillor of BBMP) and Ameer Jan were running the operation. Hooch is brewed from industrial alcohol, by separating methyl alcohol and adding water – a risky process which can leave traces of poisonous methyl alcohol. The brew is a slow poison, damaging the kidney and intestines, leading to slow death. 

On 7 July 1981, about 300 people (Official figures 229) around the Tannery Road area died as a result of consuming this spurious alcohol. Most of the victims were poor Dalits. Police registered cases against 63 people, but none were convicted or punished. An enquiry commission revealed a connection between some politicians and the bootleggers. A paltry sum of INR1000 (close to US$200) per family was paid to the victims by the Gundu Rao government.

See also 

 List of alcohol poisonings in India

References 

Karnataka Liquor Deaths, 1981
Alcohol-related deaths in India
Methanol poisoning incidents
1980s in Bangalore
History of Karnataka (1947–present)
July 1981 events in Asia